Kermanshah Nebi Akram Corps is a military unit under IRGC and Basij. Their headquarters are located in Kermanshah, and they are the main unit in Kermanshah and are responsible for commanding all Corps and Basij units located in Kermanshah province.

Background
This unit was formed in 1983 during the Iran–Iraq War. The biggest units in this corps are the 29th Nabi Akram Brigade, 4th Baaset Army, 59th Muslim Bin Aqeel Brigade, 100th Ansar al-Rasoul Brigade, Kermanshah Army, Paveh Army, West Islamabad Army, Sarpol Zahab Army, Sanghar Army, Sahne Army, and  Gilangharb Army, all of whose members are Kurds native to Kermanshah province. At present, Brigadier General Bahman Reyhani is the commander of the Nabi Akram Corps.

Activities 
The Nebi Akram Corps were deployed to Iraq and Syria during the War against the Islamic State. They became controversial during the Mahsa Amini protests after many human rights abuses were done by their soldiers, who recorded themselves as they were throwing tear gas and shooting at protesters while shouting "Allahu Akbar." They later published those videos as a "message" to other protestors. Nabi Akram fighters were heavily criticized for "attacking their own fellow Kurds", and also for arresting many activists.

The IRGC annually fund dozens of cultural, military, social, and sporting events using a sizable budget. They are held in every Iranian province. The Kermanshah Nebi Akram Corps and the Kurdistan Beit-ol-Moqaddas Corps are the ones who include Kurdish clothing and the Kurdish language in their events.

References

Kermanshah Province
Military units and formations of Army of the Guardians of the Islamic Revolution
Iranian Kurdistan
Iran–Iraq War